The Honda Nighthawk 250 is a Honda standard motorcycle.  It has a  air-cooled parallel-twin engine. While the first Nighthawk (CB650) was manufactured in 1982, the first 250 Nighthawk was manufactured in 1991. It utilized the 1985–87 CMX250 Rebel engine with all new wiring and components and reshaped the Rebel cylinder head slightly as well as incorporating a larger carburetor and new valve cover. The motorcycle changed little over the years except for color. The Nighthawk 250 is essentially a light, maneuverable, inexpensive, economical, and easy to maintain bike. It is often used in Motorcycle Safety Foundation (MSF) motorcycle training. Its small size and low seat make it a popular model for riders of smaller stature. It has drum brakes and spoked wheels at front and rear, though later models in the Australian, U.K. and Japanese markets upgraded to front disc brakes and alloy wheels. 

In contrast to the Honda Rebel 250, which offers very similar specification, the Nighthawk is considered to be an urban street-use bike, standard street motorcycle.

Nighthawk CB250
Standard motorcycles
Motorcycles introduced in 1982
Motorcycles powered by straight-twin engines

de:Honda CB 250
fr:Honda CB 250 RS
ja:ホンダ・CB250RS